Volcano is the ninth studio album by American popular music singer-songwriter Jimmy Buffett and is his 11th overall. It was released on August 1, 1979 as his first album for MCA after its absorption of ABC Dunhill.

The album and its title song are named for the then dormant Soufrière Hills volcano on the island of Montserrat in the British West Indies where Buffett recorded the album in May 1979 at AIR Studios. (The studio was severely damaged by Hurricane Hugo in 1989 and Soufrière Hills erupted again in 1995.) Additional recording was done at Quadrafonic Studios in Nashville Tennessee and Sunset Sound Studios in Los Angeles, California in the United States.  The album is dedicated to Buffett's wife and his daughter, Savannah Jane Buffett, who was born just before its release.

Songs
All of the songs are written or co-written by Buffett. Buffett performed "Volcano" with Don Henley at a 1993 Walden Woods Project benefit concert that is available on Henley's 2002 One of These Nights.

Chart performance
Volcano reached number 14 on the Billboard 200 album chart and number 13 on the Billboard Top Country Albums chart. Three singles from the album charted including "Fins" (number 35 on the Billboard Hot 100; number 42 Adult Contemporary), "Volcano" (number 66 Hot 100; number 43 Adult Contemporary), and "Survive" (number 77 Hot 100).

In the United Kingdom, "Chanson pour les petits enfants" was released as a single for Christmas 1979.  It did not chart officially, but peaked at number 86 in the Record Business magazine chart in Christmas week and became an enduringly popular song on BBC Radio 2 in a country where Buffett has had very little success.

Critical reception

Although the album generated two songs, "Fins" and "Volcano," that have become Buffett concert standards, part of 'The Big 8"  that he has played at almost all of his concerts, critical reception was less positive. Allmusic reviewer Vik Iyengar posits that "this album marks a low point for Jimmy Buffett in a decade in which he delivered one solid album after another."

Record World called the single "Survive" a "powerful ballad about long distance love."

Track listing
Side 1:
"Fins" (Jimmy Buffett, Deborah McColl, Barry Chance, Tom Corcoran) – 3:27
"Volcano" (Jimmy Buffett, Keith Sykes, Harry Dailey) – 3:37
"Treat Her Like a Lady" (Jimmy Buffett, David Loggins) – 4:18
"Stranded on a Sandbar" (Jimmy Buffett) – 3:08
"Chanson Pour Les Petits Enfants" (Jimmy Buffett) – 4:01

Side 2:
"Survive" (Jimmy Buffett, Mike Utley) – 4:50
"Lady I Can't Explain" (Jimmy Buffett) – 2:42
"Boat Drinks" (Jimmy Buffett) – 2:37
"Dreamsicle" (Jimmy Buffett) – 2:18
"Sending the Old Man Home" (Jimmy Buffett) – 3:23

Cassette pressings of the album have "Volcano" and "Dreamsicle" swapped in track order.

The running times listed for "Treat Her Like a Lady" and "Survive" on LP and CD pressings are incorrect. They are listed at 3:55 and 4:29, respectively.

Personnel
The Coral Reefer Band:
Jimmy Buffett – vocals, acoustic guitar
Keith Sykes – guitar, background vocals
Barry Chance – lead guitar
Andy McMahon – Fender Rhodes, background vocals on "Stranded"
Mike Utley – piano, organ, clavinet
Harry Dailey – bass, background vocals on "Stranded", "Chanson" and "Dreamsicle"
Russ Kunkel – drums, percussion, congas on "Volcano"
Greg "Fingers" Taylor – harmonica, organ on "Boat Drinks", shakers on "Volcano"
Johnny Montezuma – anything and everything on "Fins"
Jackie Dangler – pans on "Fins" and "Boat Drinks"
Steve Forman – percussion on "Fins"
Donald Douglas – banjo-uke on "Volcano"
Wilfred Tuitt – guitar on "Volcano"
James Elmer – bass pipe on "Volcano"
Billy Puett & Bill Jones – recorders on "Chanson Pour les Petits Enfants"
Farrell Morris – tambourine on "Chanson Pour les Petits Enfants"
Steve Forman – shakers on "Chanson Pour les Petits Enfants"
James Taylor – background vocals, guitar on "Sending the Old Man Home"
Norbert Putnam – bass on "Sending the Old Man Home"
Deborah McColl, Alex Taylor, Hugh Taylor, Dave Loggins, Venetta Fields, Brenda Bryant, Paulette Brown, Juan Cadiz – background vocals

Singles
"Fins" b/w "Dreamsicle" (Released on MCA 41109 in July 1979)
"Dreamsicle" b/w "Dreamsicle" (Released on MCA 41109 in July 1979)
"Volcano" b/w "Stranded On A Sandbar" (Released on MCA 41161 in November 1979)
"Survive" b/w "Boat Drinks" (Released on MCA 41199 in February 1980)

Tour
Buffett set out on a You Had to Be There Tour from February through April 1979, stopping in May to record Volcano. The remainder of the year Buffet toured in support of the album. One of these concerts was Buffet's first trip to Hawaii, opening for the Eagles in Aloha Stadium in September.

References

Jimmy Buffett albums
1979 albums
Albums produced by Norbert Putnam
MCA Records albums
Albums recorded at AIR Studios